Arun Amarin is a khwaeng (subdistrict) of Bangkok Noi District, in Bangkok, Thailand. In 2019, it had a total population of 19,882 people.

Naming

Its named after Arun Amarin, the road that passes through the area. Arun Amarin is the road begins at Wat Kanlaya in Thon Buri District beside Suksanari School and pass Ban Khamin, Siriraj Hospital, Wat Amarinthraram with National Museum of Royal Barges in Bangkok Noi District rim canal Khlong Bangkok Noi, before ends at the Chao Phraya River in Bang Yi Khan, Bang Phlat District under Rama VIII Bridge.

Geography
Arun Amarin is considered a northernmost and second biggest part of the district (after Bang Khun Si).

It is bordered by neighbouring subdistricts (from the north clockwise): Bang Phlat and Bang Bamru of Bang Phlat District (Borommaratchachonnani Road is a borderline), Bang Yi Khan of Bang Phlat District (Somdet Phra Pinklao Road is a borderline), Phra Borom Maha Ratchawang of Phra Nakhon District and Siri Rat in its district (Chao Phraya River and Khlong Bangkok Noi are the borderlines), Bang Khun Non in its district and Khlong Chak Phra with Taling Chan of Taling Chan District (Khlong Bangkok Noi is a borderline), respectively.

References

Subdistricts of Bangkok
Bangkok Noi district